Hyderabad Lok Sabha constituency is one of the 17 Lok Sabha (Lower House of the Parliament) constituencies in Telangana state in southern India. Delimitation of Hyderabad Lok Sabha Constituency took place in 2008.  Apart from Hyderabad constituency, there are four other Lok Sabha constituencies in and around capital city of Hyderabad -Malkajgiri, Secunderabad, Chevella and Medak. BJP's Venkaiah Naidu had once contested in Hyderabad constituency in 1996,but he lost to Sultan Salahuddin Owaisi by 73,273 votes.

Assembly segments
Hyderabad Lok Sabha constituency has the following Legislative Assembly segments:

Hyderabad Lok Sabha constituency Delimitation History  
Following Assembly constituencies were included in Hyderabad constituency during delimitation every time.

Members of Parliament

Election results

General elections, 2019

General elections, 2014

General elections, 2009

General elections, 2004

General elections, 1999

See also
 Hyderabad
 List of Constituencies of the Lok Sabha

References

External links
 Hyderabad lok sabha  constituency election 2019 date and schedule

Lok Sabha constituencies in Telangana
Hyderabad district, India
Politics of Hyderabad, India